Stanley Chinedu Ihugba (born 19 November 1987, in Jos) is a Nigerian football midfielder who plays for Skjetten.

Career
Ihugba began his career by Plateau United, joined then in 2007 to Heartland F.C. where played 36 games in his first season. He moved in January 2009 to Norway on trial; he passed through a training with FC Lyn Oslo, who has on 2 February 2009 signed a contract running to 31 December 2011. However the team went bankrupt in 2010.

After stints at Sarpsborg 08 FF and Ull/Kisa he joined Ørn-Horten in 2015. However, after half a season he was released. In 2016, he went on to Brumunddal, owing to a local fundraiser. He went on to Skjetten in 2017, and after missing the entire 2018 season, he was back in 2019.

Career statistics

References

External links
Lyn Profile
Lyn Oslo Court Nigerian Starlets

1987 births
Living people
Nigerian footballers
Nigeria international footballers
Plateau United F.C. players
Heartland F.C. players
Lyn Fotball players
Ullensaker/Kisa IL players
Sarpsborg 08 FF players
FK Ørn-Horten players
Skjetten SK players
Eliteserien players
Norwegian First Division players
Nigerian expatriate footballers
Expatriate footballers in Norway
Nigerian expatriate sportspeople in Norway
Association football midfielders
Sportspeople from Jos